Felice Mariani (11 September 1918 – 31 July 1997) was an Italian professional football player.

References

1918 births
1997 deaths
A.C. Legnano players
F.C. Pavia players
Brescia Calcio players
Inter Milan players
Italian footballers
Novara F.C. players
Serie A players
Association football midfielders
People from Caronno Pertusella